Edward Beatty  may refer to:

Edward Wentworth Beatty (1877–1943), Canadian lawyer, university chancellor, and businessman
Ed Beatty (1932–2008), American football player
Ned Beatty (1937–2021), American actor

See also
Edward Beattie (born 1934), Canadian boxer